Gugerd may refer to:
 Gugerd, Kermanshah
 Gugerd, Khuzestan
 Gugerd, West Azerbaijan